Dmitrij Korman (born 25 December 1989) is a Slovak football midfielder who currently plays for ViOn Zlaté Moravce in the Fortuna liga

FC Vion Zlaté Moravce
He made his professional debut for Zlaté Moravce against MŠK Žilina on 15 May 2013, entering in as a substitute in place of Peter Orávik.

External links
Corgoň Liga profile

References

1989 births
Living people
Slovak footballers
Association football midfielders
FC ViOn Zlaté Moravce players
Slovak Super Liga players